Charisma is a personal quality of presence or charm that compels its subjects.

Scholars in sociology, political science, psychology, and management reserve the term for a type of leadership seen as extraordinary; in these fields, the term "charisma" is used to describe a particular type of leader who uses "values-based, symbolic, and emotion-laden leader signaling".

In Christian theology, the term appears as charism, an endowment or extraordinary power given by the Holy Spirit.

Etymology
The English term charisma is from the Greek  (khárisma), which means "favor freely given" or "gift of grace". Some derivatives from that root (including "grace") have similar meanings to the modern sense of personality charisma, such as "filled with attractiveness or charm", "kindness", "to bestow a favor or service", or "to be favored or blessed". Moreover, the ancient Greek dialect widely used in Roman times employed these terms without the connotations found in modern religious usage. Ancient Greeks applied personality charisma to their gods; for example, attributing charm, beauty, nature, human creativity or fertility to goddesses they called Charites.

Theologians and social scientists have expanded and modified the original Greek meaning into two distinct senses: personality charisma and divinely conferred charisma.

The meaning of charisma has become greatly diffused from its original divinely conferred meaning, and even from the personality charisma meaning in modern English dictionaries, which reduces to a mixture of charm and status. John Potts, who has extensively analyzed the term's history, sums up meanings beneath this diffused common usage:Contemporary charisma maintains, however, the irreducible character ascribed to it by Weber: it retains a mysterious, elusive quality. Media commentators regularly describe charisma as the "X-factor". …The enigmatic character of charisma also suggests a connection – at least to some degree – to the earliest manifestations of charisma as a spiritual gift.

History

Divinely conferred charisma

The Hebrew Bible and the Christian Bible record the development of divinely conferred charisma. In the Hebrew text the idea of charismatic leadership is generally signaled by the use of the noun hen (favor) or the verb hanan (to show favor). The Greek term for charisma (grace or favor), and its root charis (grace) replaced the Hebrew terms in the Greek translation of the Hebrew Bible (the  Septuagint). Throughout, "the paradigmatic image of the charismatic hero is the figure who has received God's favor". In other words, divinely conferred charisma applied to highly revered figures.

Thus, Eastern Mediterranean Jews in the  had notions of charis and charisma that embraced the range of meanings found in Greek culture and the spiritual meanings from the Hebrew Bible. From this linguistic legacy of fused cultures, in 1 Corinthians, Paul the Apostle introduced the meaning that the Holy Spirit bestowed charism and charismata, "the gift of God's grace," upon individuals or groups. For Paul, "[t]here is a clear distinction between charisma and charis; charisma is the direct result of divine charis or grace."

He elaborates on his concepts with six references in Romans (c. 56). He makes 3 individual references in 2 Corinthians (c. 56), 1 Timothy, and 2 Timothy (c. 62 – c. 67). The seventeenth and only other mention of charisma is in 1 Peter.

The gospels, written in the late first century, apply divinely conferred charisma to revered figures. Examples are accounts of Jesus' baptism and of his transfiguration, in which disciples see him as radiant with light, appearing together with Moses and Elijah. Another example is Gabriel's greeting to Mary as "full of grace". In these and other instances early Christians designated certain individuals as possessing "spiritual gifts", and these gifts included "the ability to penetrate the neighbour to the bottom of his heart and spirit and to recognize whether he is dominated by a good or by an evil spirit and the gift to help him to freedom from his demon".

Believers characterized their revered religious figures as having "a higher perfection… a special Charisma". Then, with the establishment of the Christian Church, "the old charismatic gifts and free offerings were transformed into a hierarchical sacerdotal system". The focus on the institution rather than divinely inspired individuals increasingly dominated religious thought and life, and that focus went unchanged for centuries.

Additional changes began in the 17th century when church leaders, notably in the Latin tradition, accented "individual gifts [and] particular talents imparted by God or the Holy Spirit." The 19th century brought an increasing shift in emphasis toward individual and spiritual aspects of charisma; Protestant and some Catholic theologians narrowed the concept to superlative, out-of-the-ordinary, and virtuoso gifts. Simultaneously, the term became alienated from the much wider meaning that early Christians had attached to it. Still, the narrowed term projected back to the earlier period "A systematically reflected and highly differentiated understanding of charisma was often unconsciously infused into the Scriptures and writings of the church fathers, so that these texts were no longer read through the eyes of the authors".

These dialectic meanings influenced notable changes in Pentecostalism in the late 19th century, and charismatic movements in some mainline churches in the mid-20th century. The discussion in the 21st Century Religion section explores what charisma means in these and other religious groups.

Personality charisma

The basis for modern secular usage comes from German sociologist Max Weber. He discovered the term in the work of Rudolph Sohm, a German church historian whose 1892 Kirchenrecht was immediately recognized in Germany as an epoch-making work. It also stimulated a debate between Sohm and leading theologians and religion scholars, which lasted more than twenty years and stimulated a rich polemical literature. The debate and literature had made charisma a popular term when Weber used it in The Protestant Ethic and the Spirit of Capitalism and in his Sociology of Religion. Perhaps because he assumed that readers already understood the idea, Weber's early writings lacked definition or explanation of the concept.  In the collection of his works, Economy and Society edited by his wife, he identified the term as a prime example of action he labeled "value-rational," in distinction from and opposition to action he labeled "Instrumentally rational."  Because he applied meanings for charisma similar to Sohm, who had affirmed the purely charismatic nature of early Christianity, Weber's charisma would have coincided with the divinely conferred charisma sense defined above in Sohm's work.

Weber introduced the personality charisma sense when he applied charisma to designate a form of authority. To explain charismatic authority he developed his classic definition:Charisma is a certain quality of an individual personality by virtue of which he is set apart from ordinary men and treated as endowed with supernatural, superhuman, or at least specifically exceptional powers or qualities. These as such are not accessible to the ordinary person, but are regarded as of divine origin or as exemplary, and on the basis of them the individual concerned is treated as a leader.
Here Weber extends the concept of charisma beyond supernatural to superhuman and even to exceptional powers and qualities. Sociologist Paul Joosse examined Weber's famous definition, and found that:through simple yet profoundly consequential phrases such as “are considered” and “is treated,” charisma becomes a relational, attributable, and at last a properly sociological concept.... For Weber, the locus of power is in the led, who actively (if perhaps unconsciously) invest their leaders with social authority.

In other words, Weber indicates that it is followers who attribute powers to the individual, emphasizing that "the recognition on the part of those subject to authority" is decisive for the validity of charisma.

Weber died in 1920, leaving "disordered, fragmentary manuscripts without even the guidance of a plan or table of the proposed contents". One unfinished manuscript contained his above quoted definition of charisma. It took over a quarter century for his work to be translated into English. With regard to charisma, Weber's formulations are generally regarded as having revived the concept from its deep theological obscurity. However, even with the admirable translations and prefaces of his entire works, many scholars have found Weber's formulations ambiguous. For the past half-century they have debated the meaning of many Weberian concepts, including the meaning of charisma, the role of followers, and the degree of a supernatural component.

See also
 Charis (name)
 Superficial charm
 Trait leadership
 Instrumental and value-rational action

References

External links

Let's face it: Charisma matters from TEDx
The X-Factors of Success from Psychology Today
Max Weber and Charisma
Charisma by Thomas Robbin in the Encyclopedia of Religion and Society, edited by William H. Swatos: 
Toward a Theory of the Routinization of Charisma – April 1972
The Science of Savoir Faire
Charismatic Cults on BBC Four in Thinking Allowed 26 January 2005, presented Laurie Taylor (press on "Listen Again")
Article: "Moses, Charisma, and Covenant"
The Character of Charisma
"The Charisma Mandate" from The New York Times (February 17, 2008)
Charm School: Scholars Unpack the Secrets of Charisma, and Suggest the Elusive Quality Can Be Taught by Mark Oppenheimer from The Boston Globe, July 20, 2008

Anthropology of religion
Charismatic and Pentecostal Christianity
Jewish practices
Social influence
Social concepts
Spiritual gifts
Max Weber
Religious terminology
Christian practices